Diadegma colutellae is a wasp first described by Horstmann in 2008.
No subspecies are listed.

References

colutellae
Insects described in 2008